The Darel District is a district in Gilgit-Baltistan territory of Pakistan.
It is located towards south-west of Gilgit District. Its population lives mainly in the valley of the Darel River, a right tributary of the Indus River.

History 
Prior to 2019, the Darel District was a tehsil of the Diamer District, along with Tangir and Chilas.

Geography 
The Darel District is bounded on the north by the Ghizer District, on the north-east by the Gilgit District, on the east and southeast by the Diamer District, and on the south and west by the Upper Kohistan District of Pakistan's Khyber Pakhtunkhwa Province,

Notes

References

Districts of Gilgit-Baltistan